Thibaut Detal (born 1 January 1985, in Beauraing) is a Belgian football player who currently plays for RUS Assesse.

Career
The central midfielder recently played for R. Charleroi S.C. and for C.S. Visé in the Belgian Third Division.

References

R. Charleroi S.C. players
1985 births
Belgian footballers
Association football midfielders
Living people
C.S. Visé players